Yélékébougou is a village and rural commune in the Cercle of Kati in the Koulikoro Region of south-western Mali. The commune has an area of approximately 288 square kilometers and includes 16 villages. In the 2009 census the commune had a population of 7,257. The village of Yélékébougou is 30 km north of the town of Kati, the chef-lieu of the cercle.

References

External links
.

Communes of Koulikoro Region